Keegan Brown (born 5 November 1992) is an English professional darts player who plays in Professional Darts Corporation (PDC) events. He won the 2014 PDC World Youth Championship.

Career

Early career
Brown began playing darts at the age of nine and was playing in men's county league games for the Isle of Wight at the age of 13.
He qualified for the 2011 PDC Under-21 World Championship but lost to Michael van Gerwen 2–4 in the last 64.

In January 2012, Brown entered the Professional Darts Corporation's Q-School event in an attempt to earn a two-year tour card. He achieved this by finishing seventh on the Order of Merit after the four days of play, comfortably inside the top 24 who won their places. He mainly concentrated his 2012 season around Youth Tour tournaments, winning the 14th event in September. However, he also posted some impressive results out of the handful of main tour events he did play, most notably in the fifth and sixth Players Championships. In the former he lost to Justin Pipe 2–6 in the last 16, and in the latter he defeated the likes of James Wade, Andy Hamilton and Terry Jenkins, before losing in the semi-finals 1–6 to Dave Chisnall.

Brown entered 2013 ranked world number 86. He lost 3–5 to Joey Palfreyman in the second round of the UK Open having beaten Keith Rooney and Shaun Griffiths in prior rounds. Brown played a combination of Challenge Tour and ProTour events during the year with his deepest run on the main tour coming at the ninth Players Championship in October, which was highlighted by a second round 6–1 victory over Phil Taylor, before he was beaten 2–6 in last 16 by Mark Dudbridge.

2014
Brown's tour card expired at the start of 2014 and with him being ranked 102nd in the world, well outside of the top 64 who retain their places, he once again entered Q School. Brown lost in the final round on the first day 3–5 to Kyle Anderson, but a further defeat in the last 16 on the third day saw him finish tied second on the Q School Order of Merit to earn a fresh two-year tour card.
Brown was beaten 3–5 by Austria's Mensur Suljović in the second round of the 2014 UK Open. In the quarter-finals of the seventh Players Championship event, Brown averaged an incredible 112.32 to beat Ben Ward 6–1, sealing his win with a 10-darter. He then defeated Peter Wright 6–5 to make his first PDC final and missed four darts for the title against Robert Thornton in a 5–6 loss.

In May, Brown won the World Youth Championship 6–4 against Rowby-John Rodriguez at the O2 Arena in London as part of the Premier League finals night. The title secured Brown's place in the 2014 Grand Slam of Darts and 2015 World Championship. At the Grand Slam he lost 1–5 to Dave Chisnall in his opening group game, but then averaged 100.60 in eliminating two-time world champion Adrian Lewis 5–1, and defeated Rodriguez 5–3 to reach the last 16. He faced five-time world champion Raymond van Barneveld and raced into a 9–3 lead to stand just one leg away from the quarter-finals in his first televised event. However, Brown missed a total of five match darts as Van Barneveld closed the gap to 9–7, before he missed three darts in the next leg to allow Brown in to take out 122 on the bull to seal a 10–7 win. He also started well in the last eight against Dave Chisnall, as he held 8–2 and 12–6 leads. However, Brown could not hold on when his opponent began fighting back as Chisnall levelled at 14–14 and ended Brown's tournament with a 14–16 win.

2015
Brown was drawn to face John Part in the first round of the 2015 World Championship, with the match going into a final set after Brown had led 2–0. He took it without reply to win 3–2 and advance to the second round. There, five of the six sets against Adrian Lewis went to deciding legs, with Lewis getting the better of Brown in a 4–2 win. He entered the top 64 on the Order of Merit for the first time afterwards, as the world number 52. Brown was named the PDC's Young Player of the Year at the annual awards dinner. He lost 2–9 to Nathan Derry in the third round of the UK Open. Brown reached the final of the eighth Players Championship and took out a pair of 130 finishes as he averaged 111.72 in defeating Lewis 6–3 to claim his first professional title.

Brown made his debut in the World Matchplay and he started very well to be 5–1 ahead of Robert Thornton and went on to win 10–7. He relinquished an 8–5 advantage over Dave Chisnall in the second round as he was beaten 11–13. Brown also qualified for the World Grand Prix for the first time and lost 1–2 in sets to Michael van Gerwen in the opening round. He needed a win over James Wade in his final group game at the Grand Slam to advance to the second round but lost 2–5, and from 4–4 in the first round of the Players Championship Finals he lost 4–6 to Michael van Gerwen, having missed deciding darts in both of the last two games.

2016
Brown could only win two legs in the first round of the 2016 World Championship during a 0–3 defeat to Peter Wright. He could not win enough matches to qualify for the UK Open. His only quarter-final on the Pro Tour in 2016 was at the fifth Players Championship and he lost 3–6 to Michael van Gerwen. Brown was defeated 3−4 by Aden Kirk in the final of the 11th Development Tour event. He qualified for the Players Championship Finals and lost 5–6 to Ian White in the first round, missing three match darts in the process. Brown could not play in his third successive World Championship as he was knocked out in the fourth round of the qualifier 4–5 by Mark Frost.

2018
Brown made it through to the last 16 of the 2018 PDC World Darts Championship, defeating James Wade on route, where he faced Phil Taylor. Brown stated he intended on ending Taylor's career in the match. Taylor won the match comprehensively, 0–4.

2019

Brown lost 4–3 to James Wade in the third round of the 2019 PDC World Darts Championship despite leading 3–1 in sets.
Brown's first major of 2019 was the UK Open, where he entered at the last 96 because of his ranking. He defeated Nathan Derry 6–5, before beating William O'Connor 10–4 to move into the last 32. In a tight game all the way, Keegan was eventually defeated 8–10 by Steve Beaton.

In Players Championship 8 in March, Brown saw off Dave Chisnall, Christian Kist, Benito van de Pas, Cristo Reyes and Andy Boulton, before he was defeated 6–7 by Raymond van Barneveld in his first semi-final since September 2018, 

Brown qualified for the German Darts Championship by defeating Peter Hudson 6–1 and Bradley Brooks 6–5 in the UK Qualifier. In the first round, he opened up a 5–2 lead against Madars Razma, but was pegged back to 5–5. However, Brown pinned a 116 checkout in the decider to set up a tie with world number 1 Michael van Gerwen. Brown, then world number 36, produced the performance of a lifetime to defy a 108 average from van Gerwen, and defeat him 6–4 with 100% on doubles. Keegan defeated James Wilson 6–0 in the last 16 with a 98 average, before defeating Gerwyn Price 6–5 in a thriller to qualify for his first Euro Tour semi-final; his opponent was fellow unseeded player, Ricky Evans. This game was one step too far for Brown as he lost 3–7, but his run to the semi finals caused him to make the top 32 in the PDC Order of Merit for the first time.

2020 
At the 2020 PDC World Darts Championship, Brown lost 3–2 to Seigo Asada in the second round.

2021
At the 2021 PDC World Darts Championship, Brown lost 3–1 to Dave Chisnall in the second round.

In November Keegan returned to County Darts to join Essex after an 11 year absence. He made his Essex debut away at Cheshire on 29th November, where he lost 4-3 to Stuart Kellett. On December 12th he earned his first victory in an Essex County shirt beating Aaron Turner of Hampshire with a 4-0 win recording a 29.91 average.

2022
He appeared on Eggheads with Glen Durrant on 1 November 2022.

2023
At the 2023 PDC World Darts Championship, Brown lost 3–2 in the first round to Florian Hempel. This defeat meant he dropped out of the world's top 64 and lost his tour card but regained it at Q-School.

Personal life 
Brown is named after the footballer Kevin Keegan. He works as a medical lab assistant in blood services on the Isle of Wight.

World Championship results

PDC
 2015: Second round (lost to Adrian Lewis 2–4)
 2016: First round (lost to Peter Wright 0–3)
 2018: Third round (lost to Phil Taylor 0–4)
 2019: Third round (lost to James Wade 3–4)
 2020: Second round (lost to Seigo Asada 2–3)
 2021: Second round (lost to Dave Chisnall 1–3)
 2023: First round (lost to Florian Hempel 2–3)

Performance timeline

PDC European Tour

References

External links

1992 births
Living people
Sportspeople from Durham, England
People from Newport, Isle of Wight
English darts players
Professional Darts Corporation current tour card holders
PDC world youth champions
PDC ranking title winners
21st-century English people